Ben Fortunado Marcune  is an American sculptor and painter, working primarily in the figurative and representational styles.

Early life and career
Marcune was born in New York City on March 30, 1935. He lived in Brooklyn and then moved with his family first to Florida and later to California.  Marcune attended UCLA and Caltech in the 1950s and earned a Master's degree in Human Factors Engineering. After serving as a medic in the United States Army in Korea, Marcune worked as a biomedical and industrial designer. He obtained patents for several surgical and orthopedic devices, using his creative and drawing talents for these endeavors. He also performed as a lead dancer for the Philadelphia Civic Ballet.

Marcune attended in Pennsylvania Academy of Fine Arts in the 1970s and is a Fellow of the PAFA class of 1976.  He studied with Ben Kamihera, Arthur DeCosta and Emile Gruppe. Marcune began to shift his focus from engineering and design to the fine arts and by the late 1980s was painting full time. In the 1990s through the present, Marcune combined his focus on landscapes and portraits with work on public bronze sculptures. He currently maintains three working studios in Northampton and Bucks County, Pennsylvania.

Marcune's heroic size bronze sculptures are located primarily in Pennsylvania. These include the Korean-Vietnam Memorial on the campus of Lehigh Carbon Community College, the Worker’s Memorial in the Bethlehem Rose Garden, and Jesus as Teacher on the campus of DeSales University, Center Valley, Pennsylvania. His portraits of institutional and community leaders have been commissioned by many organizations, including Quakertown National Bank, St. Luke’s Hospital, Moravian College, DeSales University and Lafayette College. His oil landscapes are in numerous public and private collections, including Lehigh Valley Hospital, St. Luke’s Hospital, DeSales University and UGI.

References

Thinsculpture.com 
http://www.thinksculpture.com/project_list.asp?cli=65

External links
 https://www.youtube.com/watch?v=GT3CvU2YaGc Ben Marcune: Artist Extraordinaire
 http://www.marcune.com Ben Fortunado Marcune's website
 https://www.youtube.com/watch?v=94QvGm2SgQA Jesus The Teacher, 18 ft bronze Ben Fortunado Marcune sculpture, installed at DeSales University
 http://www.bucksarts.org/my-profile/userprofile/627 Arts & Cultural Council of Bucks County
 https://www.facebook.com/bmarcune/ Marcune Facebook Page
 http://www.thinksculpture.com/project_list.asp?cli=65&order_by=client Art Research
 http://articles.mcall.com/1993-06-06/news/2913934_1_human-figure-plasterer-xavier-cugat Morning Call Article
 http://www.desales.edu/salesian-home/archive/news-and-information/news-story/2014/06/19/statues-of-father-brisson-and-the-good-mother-blessed-during-oblate-convocation DeSales University Website Article
 http://blogs.desales.edu/dsudaily/2016/04/26/why-is-the-jesus-the-teacher-statue-beardless/ The DeSales Daily online blog
 https://web.archive.org/web/20161201082309/http://historicbethlehem.org/ben-marcune/ Historic Bethlehem Partnership
 https://web.archive.org/web/20160326012206/http://cdn.nucloud.com/maps/304/1432229783/mobile_stops/7357.html Our Lady of Deliverance Statue
 https://web.archive.org/web/20160326011318/http://cdn.nucloud.com/maps/304/1432229783/mobile_stops/7361.html St. Francis De Sales Statue
 https://web.archive.org/web/20160326011307/http://cdn.nucloud.com/maps/304/1432229783/mobile_stops/7362.html St. Jane De Chantal Statue

1935 births
Living people
American male sculptors
American male painters
Pennsylvania Academy of the Fine Arts alumni
20th-century American sculptors
20th-century American painters
20th-century American male artists